Onaman Lake is a lake in Thunder Bay District in northern Ontario, Canada.

This is from Ojibwa onâman 'vermillion, red clay'.

See also
List of lakes in Ontario

References
 National Resources Canada

Lakes of Thunder Bay District